The Green Mountains are a mountain range in the U.S. state of Vermont.

All mountains in Vermont are often referred to as the "Green Mountains". However, other ranges within Vermont, including the Taconic Mountains in southwestern Vermont and the Northeastern Highlands, are not geologically part of the Green Mountains.

Peaks

The best-known mountains—for reasons such as high elevation, ease of public access by road or trail (especially the Long Trail and Appalachian Trail), or with ski resorts or towns nearby—in the range include:

 Mount Mansfield, the highest point in Vermont
 Killington Peak, 
 Camel's Hump, 
 Mount Ellen, 
 Mount Abraham, 
 Pico Peak, 
 Stratton Mountain, the mountain at which the initial ideas of both the Long Trail and the Appalachian Trail were born
 Jay Peak, receives the most snowfall on average in the eastern United States.
 Bread Loaf Mountain, 
 Mount Wilson, 
 Glastenbury Mountain, 
 Burke Mountain, 

The Green Mountains are part of the Appalachian Mountains, a range that stretches from Quebec in the north to Alabama in the south. The Green Mountains are part of the New England/Acadian forests ecoregion.

Three peaks—Mount Mansfield, Camel's Hump, and Mount Abraham—support alpine vegetation.

Tourism
Some of the mountains are developed for skiing and other snow-related activities. Others have hiking trails for use in summer. Mansfield, Killington, Pico, and Ellen have downhill ski resorts on their slopes.

History
The Vermont Republic, also known as the Green Mountain Republic, existed from 1777 to 1791, at which time Vermont became the 14th state.

Vermont not only takes its state nickname ("The Green Mountain State") from the mountains, it is named after them. The French Monts Verts or Verts Monts is literally translated as "Green Mountains". This name was suggested in 1777 by Dr. Thomas Young, an American revolutionary and Boston Tea Party participant.  The University of Vermont and State Agricultural College is referred to as UVM, after the Latin Universitas Viridis Montis (University of the Green Mountains).

Geology and physiography

The Green Mountains are a physiographic section of the larger New England province, which in turn is part of the larger Appalachian physiographic division.

Lemon Fair runs through the towns of Orwell, Sudbury, Shoreham, Bridport, and Cornwall, Vermont, before flowing into Otter Creek. The story is that its name derives from early English-speaking settlers' phonetic approximation of 'Les Monts Verts'.

See also 
 Green Mountain National Forest
 Green Mountain Parkway
 Green Mountain Boys—paramilitary infantry led by Ethan Allen that took Fort Ticonderoga during the American Revolution
 Green Mountain Club

References

External links

 
 

Landforms of Addison County, Vermont
Landforms of Bennington County, Vermont
Landforms of Chittenden County, Vermont
Landforms of Lamoille County, Vermont
Landforms of Orleans County, Vermont
Landforms of Rutland County, Vermont
Landforms of Washington County, Vermont
Landforms of Windham County, Vermont
Mountain ranges of Quebec
Mountain ranges of Vermont
Physiographic sections
Regions of Vermont
Subranges of the Appalachian Mountains
Vermont culture